Manopsak Kram (born 27 November 1988 in Alor Setar, Kedah) is a Thai-Malaysian footballer and younger brother of footballer Samransak Kram. He currently plays for Pos Malaysia FC as a midfielder.

He also has played in Kedah's President Cup starting from 2006 to 2008 season.

References

1988 births
Living people
Malaysian footballers
Kedah Darul Aman F.C. players
Malaysian people of Thai descent
People from Kedah
Association football midfielders